Etlingera labellosa is a monocotyledonous plant species that was first described by Karl Moritz Schumann, and given its current name by Rosemary Margaret Smith. Etlingera labellosa is part of the genus Etlingera and the family Zingiberaceae.

Range
The species is found in Papua New Guinea.

References 

labellosa
Taxa named by Rosemary Margaret Smith